Events in the year 1864 in Brazil.

Incumbents
Monarch – Pedro II.
Prime Minister – Marquis of Olinda (until 15 January), Zacarias de Góis e Vasconcelos (from 15 January to 21 August), Francisco José Furtado (starting 31 August).

Events

Births

Deaths

References

 
1860s in Brazil
Years of the 19th century in Brazil
Brazil
Brazil